The 2001 Australian GT Production Car Championship was a CAMS sanctioned motor racing title open to production cars. It was the sixth Australian GT Production Car Championship to be awarded.

The Australian championship was won by Queensland driver Brett Peters, driving a Subaru Impreza WRX ran by the Rod Dawson led Peters Motorsport team. Peters took a 28.5 championship victory over fellow Subaru driver Wayne Boatwright with HSV driver Phillip Polities a further 21.5 points back in third.

The series ran on an eleven-round calendar but not all of the five classes raced at every meeting, with each class racing eight of the eleven rounds. The separated calendar was the beginning of the separation of competitors into what would become completely separate championships in 2003 as the Australian Performance Car Championship and Australian Production Car Championship. The separation additionally meant that drivers on the second group of classes were no longer eligible for the Australian Championship.

Classes
Cars competed in five classes:
 Class A: High Performance Cars
 Class B: Sports Touring Cars
 Class C: V8 Touring Cars
 Class D: 6 Cylinder Touring Cars
 Class E: 4 Cylinder Touring Cars

Calendar
The Outright, Class A & Class B titles were contested over an eight-round "GT Performance" series.

The Class C, Class D & Class E titles were contested over an eight-round "GT Production" series.

Results

Outright Drivers Championship

Note: Only half points were awarded for Race 2 of Round 4 at Queensland Raceway as the race was red flagged.

Drivers Class Championships

Manufacturers Award

Note: Points awarded to Holden included points scored by HSV vehicles.

References

Australian GT Production Car Championship
GT Production Car Championship
Procar Australia